Lili Novy née Haumeder (24 December 1885 – 7 March 1958) was a Slovene poet and translator of poetry. She is considered the first Slovene female lyric poet as well as one of the most important Slovene female poets in general.

Biography
She was born in Graz as Lili Haumeder to an ethnic German father named Guid Haumeder and a Slovene mother Ludvika Ahačič. She was educated privately and began writing poetry in German. 

In her mid twenties she began to include herself in the Slovene literary scene and began translating Prešeren's German poems into Slovene and vice versa and also began publishing in literary magazines. She also translated a lot of Goethe into Slovene. Gradually, under the influence of Alojz Gradnik, she began writing her own poetry in Slovene. During her lifetime only one collection of her own poems was published: Temna vrata (Dark Door) (1941). After spending an entire life on the move with a husband in the military, Lili Novy eventually settled in Ljubljana.

Death and legacy
Novy died in 1958 at Ljubljana. She was 72 years old. Her bust marks the house in the centre of the old town where she lived. One of the halls in the Cankar Hall Cultural Centre in Ljubljana is also named after her.

In the 1970s, the essayist Jože Javoršek published a monograph on Novy which led to a positive reassessment of her work.

Published work 
 Temna vrata (Dark Door) - poetry collection (1941)
 Oboki (Arches) - poetry collection (1959)
 Pikapoka - collection of children's poems (1968)
 Majhni ste na tem velikem svetu (You are Small in this Big World) - collection of children's poems (1973)

External links 
 RTV Slovenia programme on Lili Novy (in Slovene)
 Lili Novy - Poezija in mišljenje

1885 births
1958 deaths
Slovenian women poets
Slovenian poets
Slovenian translators
German–Slovene translators
Slovenian people of German descent
Writers from Graz
Writers from Ljubljana
20th-century poets
20th-century women writers
20th-century translators
German people of Slovenian descent
Burials at Žale